The 2001 World Interuniversity Games were the third edition of the Games (organised by IFIUS), and were held in Paris, France.

External links
 Homepage IFIUS

2001 in multi-sport events
2001 in French sport
2001
International sports competitions hosted by Paris
2001 in Paris
Multi-sport events in France
October 2001 sports events in France